Charles Lisle Carr (26 September 1871 – 20 May 1942) was an Anglican clergyman who served as the second bishop of the restored see of Coventry in the modern era and the 107th Bishop of Hereford in a long line stretching back to the 7th century.

Early life
Carr was born in Alnwick, Northumberland, the younger son of Robert Carr. He was educated at Liverpool College, and St Catharine's, Cambridge, to which college he was elected a Fellow in 1934. After university he took Holy Orders at Ridley Hall, Cambridge and embarked on a varied clerical career that took him to many urban locations.

Ecclesiastical career
Carr was curate of Aston-juxta-Birmingham, 1894–97; Redditch, 1897; Tutor of Ridley Hall, Cambridge, 1897–1902; Vicar of St Sepulchre, Cambridge, 1901–02; Vicar of St. Nicholas, Blundellsands, Liverpool, 1902–06; Rector of Woolton, Liverpool, 1906–12; Vicar of Yarmouth 1912–20; Archdeacon of Norfolk, 1916–18; Archdeacon of Norwich, 1918–20; Vicar of Sheffield, 1920–22; Honorary Canon of Sheffield Cathedral, 1920; Archdeacon of Sheffield, 1920–22; Bishop of Coventry, 1922–31; Bishop of Hereford, 1931–41.

Family
Carr was married, at the Holy Sepulchre church, Cambridge, on 1 July 1902, to Isabel Wortley Drury, daughter of Thomas Drury, the principal of Ridley Hall. They had one son. Carr retired in 1941, dying the following February. His wife survived him by 22 years.

Carr was an active Freemason in the City of Coventry.

Notes

1871 births
1942 deaths
People educated at Liverpool College
Alumni of St Catharine's College, Cambridge
Fellows of St Catharine's College, Cambridge
Archdeacons of Sheffield
Archdeacons of Norfolk
Archdeacons of Norwich
Bishops of Coventry
Bishops of Hereford
20th-century Church of England bishops
People from Alnwick